Rwake is an American sludge metal band from North Little Rock, Arkansas, United States.

History 
Rwake began as a four-piece in 1996. The band was originally called Wake. The first Wake show was March 15, 1997 in Batesville, Arkansas at the Landers Theater.

They began touring in October 2001, and self-released two recordings, Xenoglossalgia: The Last Stage of Awareness, and Absence Due to Projection. Since then four more albums were released, Hell is a Door to the Sun, If You Walk Before You Crawl, You Crawl Before You Die, Voices Of Omens and Rest.

The band signed with Relapse Records in January 2006, and released Voices Of Omens in February 2007.  After their Relapse debut, Rwake maintained a busy touring schedule in support of Voices Of Omens. Since then the band has laid low playing a few road stints here and there and going over seas two different times to Hellfest in France, and back for Roadburn in the Netherlands and further dates in Europe and finally the UK. The band finished up work for their second album on Relapse titled Rest, which was released September 27, 2011.

Members 

Current
Jeff Morgan – drums, acoustic guitar (1996–present)
Chris "CT" Terry – vocals (1996–present)
Kris "Gravy" Graves – guitar (1996–present)
Chris Newman – guitar (1998–2001, 2013–present)
Brittany "The B" Fugate – moog, vocals, samples (1999–present)
Kiffin Rogers – guitar (2003–present)
John Judkins – bass (2011–present)

Former
Aaron Mills – bass (1996–1999)
Rob Eaton – keyboards, vocals (1997–1999)
Reid Raley – bass, and forever honorary member (1999–2011, 2015) 
Chuck Schaaf – guitar (2002), tour drums (2008)

Timeline

Discography 
Studio albums
Absence Due to Projection (1999)
Hell is a Door to the Sun (2002)
If You Walk Before You Crawl, You Crawl Before You Die (2004)
Voices of Omens (2007)
Rest (2011) Relapse Records

Demos, EP, Splits and Compilations
Suicide: The Quest For Oblivion (1997)
Frozen Dawn IV Compilation (1998)
Xenoglossalgia: The Last Stage of Awareness (1998)
South of Hell Compilation (2001)
Destroys All:A Tribute to Godzilla Compilation (2003)
split 7inch w/Sloth (song-hell is a door live) (2004)
Forge 7inch (songs Forge and Imbedded live) (2012)

Live album
Swallowed by the Void Forever: Live at Maryland Deathfest (2013)

References

External links 
Official Relapse Records Band Page
Official Myspace Page

Musical groups established in 1996
Heavy metal musical groups from Arkansas
American sludge metal musical groups
American doom metal musical groups
Relapse Records artists